Victor-Mugurel Anagnastopol (born 23 March 1986) is a Romanian tennis player. On 13 June 2011, he reached his highest ATP singles ranking of 469 whilst his highest doubles ranking was 295 achieved on 12 December 2012.

Career finals

Doubles finals: 1 (1–0)

References

External links

1986 births
Living people
Tennis players from Bucharest
Romanian male tennis players
Romanian expatriates in Italy
21st-century Romanian people